Mad Dogs & Englishmen is a 1971 American documentary film of Joe Cocker's 1970 U.S. tour, directed by Pierre Adidge, starring  Cocker and Leon Russell. The film was released on March 29, 1971, by Metro-Goldwyn-Mayer.

Cast 

Joe Cocker 
Leon Russell 
Chris Stainton
Jim Price 
Bobby Keys
Jim Gordon
Jim Keltner 
Carl Radle 
Don Preston 
Sandy Konikoff
Chuck Blackwell
Bobby Torres
Jim Horn	
Rita Coolidge 
Claudia Lennear 	
Donna Washburn
Donna Weiss
Pamela Poland 
Matthew Moore
Daniel Moore 	
Bobby Jones
Nicole Barclay	
Denny Cordell 
Barney Cordell		
Tarka Cordell 		
Sherman Jones
Emily Smith
Connie Di Nardo
Gail Stainton
Linda Wolf
Andrea Cohen
Carol Hughsby
Carla Brown
Sean Brown
Kay Poorboy
Francine Brockey
Judy Keys
Sallay Clear
Darlene Coy
Canina - the dog

Reception
Roger Ebert of the Chicago Sun-Times gave the film three stars out of four and wrote that "the musical scenes are the best rock coverage since 'Woodstock.' The sound is first rate, for one thing, and director Pierre Adidge has some idea of why Cocker electrifies a crowd." Vincent Canby of The New York Times called the film a "most satisfying, record-album of a movie" which "patronizes neither its audience nor its stars ... It is uncluttered, one of the best concert films so far." A review in Variety said, "Considerable technical expertise has gone into this production, and though the objective may be clear, it just hasn't turned out to be another 'Woodstock,' possibly because Joe Cocker's personality isn't all that endearing." Gene Siskel of the Chicago Tribune rated the film three stars out of four and wrote, "'Mad Dogs' is distinguishable from other 'rockumentaries' because it deals almost exclusively with the musician and his music. There are few side trips to cultural comments." Robert Hilburn of the Los Angeles Times stated, "As a film, 'Mad Dogs and Englishmen' is a good concert. For much of the picture's 114 minutes, the camera is on Joe Cocker, by most standards the best and most exciting singer in rock music ... But 'Mad Dogs and Englishmen,' unfortunately, fails in the end to rise above this interesting, but clearly limited historical summary of the Cocker tour. As a film, it doesn't establish its own importance." A negative review by Tom Zito of The Washington Post advised readers to "Forget the film and try the record," explaining, "What emerges from all this is roughly two hours of footage that looks terrible on the screen and sounds almost as bad. The film is projected in an annoying square format, except for the moments when the screen area is broken up into some poorly coordinated split-screen effects. The camerawork is often sloppy ... the whole thing winds up looking and sounding like a cheap, imitation (indoor) 'Woodstock.'" James D. White of The Monthly Film Bulletin declared that "The music itself is excellent," but "The film's information content is minimal; and one's heart sinks as the screen is split into a double image for the first number and as the mandatory shots—of excited fans, of joint-rolling in a hotel bedroom, of an interview with a vacuous groupie—are inevitably wheeled out."

See also
 List of American films of 1971

References

External links 
 

1971 films
American documentary films
1971 documentary films
Metro-Goldwyn-Mayer films
A&M Films films
1970s English-language films
1970s American films